"Seven Year Ache" is a song written and recorded by American country music artist Rosanne Cash. It was released in February 1981 as the first single and title track from Cash's album of the same name. The song was Cash's first of ten No. 1 hits on the US Country charts.

Music video
A music video, Cash's first, was made for the song. Directed by Arnold Levine, and produced by Yvonne May. It was filmed at EXIT/IN Nashville Music Forum in Nashville, Tennessee, and features Cash singing to a crowd, accompanied by her full band.

Commercial performance
"Seven Year Ache" was Cash's fourth single and her first single released in 1981. Considered her breakthrough recording, the song was Cash's first No. 1 on the Billboard Country Chart, while also crossing over to the Billboard Pop Chart, reaching No. 22.  It was also a Top 10 Adult contemporary hit, cresting at No. 6.

The single was issued on Cash's second studio album, Seven Year Ache that year, which also produced the No. 1 hits "My Baby Thinks He's a Train" and "Blue Moon with Heartache."

Charts

Notable cover versions
"Seven Year Ache" has been recorded several times. American country artist Trisha Yearwood recorded a version for her 2001 album Inside Out that featured Cash herself singing background vocals.

References

1981 singles
1981 songs
Rosanne Cash songs
Trisha Yearwood songs
Songs written by Rosanne Cash
Columbia Records singles
Song recordings produced by Rodney Crowell